Dave Palmer is an American session keyboardist native to Texas and living in Ojai, California. Palmer has toured, performed, or recorded with Air, Fiona Apple, Seal, Chris Isaak, Joe Henry, Bobby Previte, Wayne Horvitz, Fleetwood Mac, Ponga, Critters Buggin, MC 900 Ft. Jesus, Aimee Mann, Solomon Burke, Turin Brakes, Cake, Lindsey Buckingham, Tegan and Sara, and Avenged Sevenfold.

Palmer is a member of the Denton, Texas and Los Angeles, California-based Earl Harvin Trio. In 2006 Palmer released the solo album Romance.

Reviewer Glenn Astarita considers Palmer a "top-notch acoustic jazz pianist".

Selected discography
 Strange Happy, Earl Harvin and Dave Palmer (1997)
 Live at the Gypsy Tea Room, Earl Harvin Trio (1999)
 Unincorporated, Earl Harvin Trio (2001)
 The Jam, Fred Hamilton & the Earl Harvin Trio (DVD, 2005)
 Romance (2006)

References

External links
Official site

American session musicians
Musicians from Texas
Living people
People from Denton, Texas
People from Studio City, Los Angeles
1968 births
21st-century American keyboardists
Ponga (band) members